Phillip Walker may refer to:

Phillip Walker (musician) (1937–2010), American blues guitarist
P. J. Walker (born 1995), American football quarterback
Phillip Walker House, historic American Colonial house in Rhode Island

See also
Phil Walker (disambiguation)